Terence Cao Guohui (born 6 October 1967) is a Singaporean television actor.

Biography
Cao studied at Anglo-Chinese School for both his primary and secondary education. Cao used to be a flight attendant and joined Singapore Broadcasting Corporation (later MediaCorp) in 1989 after completing the 9th drama training course. Apart from acting in several Channel 8 television drama series, Cao has also performed the theme songs for some of the series he starred in and has also acted in some television films. In 2011, he clinched the Best Supporting Actor in the Star Awards 2011.

Cao has gotten 7 out of 10 Top 10 Most Popular Male Artistes from 1994, 1998–2001, 2004–2005 respectively.

Personal life
In November 2012, it was reported in the local media that Cao had an alleged affair with a Shanghainese lady in 2010. The woman went on to bear his child in China and flew to Singapore to look for him. After a DNA test, the rumours were confirmed. Cao is the biological father of the then 20-month-old girl.
In March 2021, Cao was charged for breaking Singapore's COVID-19 restrictions.

Filmography

TV series

Accolades

References

External links

Mediacorp Bio
Profile on xinmsn

Living people
1967 births
Singaporean people of Cantonese descent
Anglo-Chinese School alumni
Singaporean male television actors